Alexandra Lemoine (born 1 April 1928) is a French former artistic gymnast. She competed at the 1952 Summer Olympics. She was born in Dachnów, Poland.

References

External links
 

1928 births
Possibly living people
French female artistic gymnasts
Gymnasts at the 1952 Summer Olympics
Olympic gymnasts of France
Medalists at the World Artistic Gymnastics Championships
20th-century French women